Athenkosi Dyili (born 17 July 1984) is a South African former cricketer. He played in 82 first-class, 70 List A, and 33 Twenty20 matches from 2004 to 2014.

References

External links
 

1984 births
Living people
South African cricketers
Border cricketers
Eastern Province cricketers
Warriors cricketers
Sportspeople from Qonce